Cara Evelyn Knott (February 11, 1966 – December 27, 1986) was an American student at San Diego State University who disappeared on December 27, 1986, while driving from her boyfriend's home in Escondido, California, to her parents' house in El Cajon. The following day, December 28, her car was found on a dead-end road at the Mercy Road off-ramp from I-15 in San Diego County. Her body was recovered at the bottom of a 65-foot ravine nearby.

Her killer, Craig Alan Peyer (born March 16, 1950 to Harold and Eileen Peyer), was a police officer and 13-year veteran of the California Highway Patrol (CHP). At Peyer's trial, it was revealed that he had been targeting women along the interstate and had made predatory sexual advances on multiple female drivers. He was convicted of Knott's murder in 1988.

Murder

On the night of December 27, 1986, 20-year-old Cara Knott was driving south on Interstate 15 from her boyfriend's home in Escondido, California, to her parents' home in El Cajon when Peyer, who was on duty in a marked CHP patrol car, directed Knott to pull off the freeway on an isolated, unfinished off-ramp. It was later discovered that Peyer also had been harassing several other female drivers in the same area by pulling them over on the same off-ramp, supposedly trying to pick them up as dates. In the Knott case, it was believed that the situation escalated to physicality when Knott threatened to report Peyer for his inappropriate actions. When he attempted to grab her, she slashed and scratched at his face. Peyer then bludgeoned her with his flashlight and strangled her to death with a rope. He then threw her body over the edge of an abandoned bridge, where she fell into the brush below.

Coincidentally, two days later, while covering the investigation of the murder, a reporter with KCST-TV interviewed Officer Peyer during a ride-along segment about self-protection for female drivers. At the time of the interview, Peyer had scratches on his face which, as details of the case unfolded, were thought to have been inflicted by Knott during the struggle with him. He tried to explain they were caused when he fell against a fence in the CHP parking lot but the fence was found to be too high to have caused the scratches on Peyer's face. Moreover, within about the hour of when the murder was thought to have occurred witnesses at a gas station saw a disheveled Peyer drive in at high speed. One of them, an off-duty San Diego police officer, reported seeing the scratch marks an hour before Peyer claimed he got them.

Investigation

Just after the KCST broadcast, nearly two dozen telephone calls, mostly from women, were received by authorities, with the callers reporting that Peyer was the officer who had pulled them over on the same off-ramp, even though in these cases Peyer was not hostile or violent towards them. They said that while he may have been friendly with them, he also made them uncomfortable. In some cases, he gently stroked their hair and shoulders, which caused them some distress. In addition, several women had made complaints about him before the murder, but these were dismissed because of Peyer’s reputation within the department.

Another witness said he saw a patrol car accompanying a Volkswagen Beetle, which was thought to be the one Knott was driving, in that exact area at about the time the murder was known to have occurred. Knott last was seen alive at a Chevron gas station just two miles away from the murder scene. The attendant remembered seeing a marked  CHP patrol car making a U-turn on the road just after Knott had driven away.

Peyer's own logbook revealed a hasty falsification about that time as well as changes he made to several traffic tickets that had been written some time later, according to the motorists to whom the tickets were written. Forensic dentist Norman Sperber examined the rope found in his patrol car, and he determined they seemed to match the rope marks around the victim's neck, although Sperber was later barred from testifying about his findings in court.

A distinctive and unusual gold rayon fiber—found to have been made using a yellow pigment instead of a dye—found on Knott's dress matched a shoulder patch Peyer wore on his CHP uniform. Tire tracks on the bridge showed a car had pulled out hastily leaving black marks on the pavement. Furthermore, a drop of blood was found on one of Knott's boots, which was found to be consistent with Peyer's blood type (AB negative, the rarest type) and other genetic markers, although conclusive DNA testing was not available at the time of the investigation. Microscopic purple fibers also linked Peyer to Knott's murder.

Peyer's fellow officers testified to the defendant's strange actions following the murder, with his continuous requests regarding the investigation's status and his attempts to justify the perpetrator's crime as a mistake. An internal investigation showed that while he stopped many drivers for various legitimate violations, most of them were females who were driving alone. Additionally, they were of the same age group and physical description as Cara Knott.

Trials
The first trial resulted in a hung jury, after a 7-5 split in favor of conviction. Upon retrial, testimony regarding a potential second suspect and a hearsay explanation for the defendant's scratches was ruled inadmissible, and Peyer was found guilty of murder, the first conviction of murder by an on-duty CHP officer. On August 4, 1988, Peyer was sentenced to 25 years to life.

After conviction, Peyer continued to claim his innocence. In 2004, Peyer was asked if he would contribute a sample of his DNA to a San Diego County program, which had been designed and initiated to use DNA samples to possibly exonerate wrongfully imprisoned persons as such testing was not yet available at the time of his trial and conviction. 

Peyer refused to provide DNA for the test. At an initial parole hearing in 2004 after having served 17 years, when asked why he wouldn't provide a DNA sample, Peyer refused to answer. For this reason and his lack of remorse, the board denied his parole request.

Aftermath
Shortly after the crime and trial, a wave of incidents was reported when female drivers traveling alone refused to stop when ordered to by the police.

On November 30, 2000, Sam Knott, Cara Knott's father, died of a heart attack only a few yards from the site where Cara's body was discovered, where the family had constructed a memorial garden for her.

Peyer has been denied parole two additional times: in 2008 (after serving 21 years), and 2012 (after serving 25 years). His next eligibility for a parole hearing was set for 15 years later, in January 2027, when he will be almost 77 years old. Peyer is serving his sentence at California Men's Colony in San Luis Obispo, California, which is considered a "country club" and "garden spot" among California prisons. At the time of his second parole hearing in 2008, he had "a nearly unblemished prison record" and "worked as an electrician at the facility" for years, making $52 per month in salary from the job in 2003. He had worked briefly as an apprentice electrician after getting fired from CHP while on bail before the trial. His third wife, Karen, whom he married 18 months before the murder and who visited him regularly divorced him around 2007.

Media
The Craig Peyer case has been covered in several books:
 True Stories of Law & Order: SVU by Kevin Dwyer and Juré Fiorillo (Berkley/Penguin 2007)
 You're the Jury by Judge Norbert Enrenfreund and Lawrence Treat (Holt Paperbacks 1992)
 Badge of Betrayal: The Devastating True Story of a Rogue Cop Turned Murderer by Joe Cantlupe and Lisa Petrillo (Avon Books (Mm) 1991.)
One Day: The Extraordinary Story of an Ordinary 24 Hours in America by Gene Weingarten (Blue Rider Press 2019)
The case was also the subject of a few episodes of different television shows:
 City Confidential: "Badge of Dishonor" (2003)
 Unusual Suspects: "Betrayal of Trust" (2011, Season 1, Episode 2) - Investigation Discovery TV series
 Forensic Files: "Badge of Betrayal" (2004, Season 9, Episode 18).

See also
Cara Knott Memorial Bridge
Police misconduct in the United States

References

External links
1988: A California Highway Patrolman Is Tried Once Again for a Shocking Murder Under the Freeway
2004: The Killer Cop
2004: Killer Peyer refused prosecutors' offer to test DNA
2004: Parole board to revisit Knott murder
2008: No Clemency for Peyer 
2012: Parole denied for CHP officer
 Memorial page for the victim, Cara Knott via Internet Archive

California Department of Corrections and Rehabilitation Inmate Locator

1980s in San Diego
1986 in California
1986 murders in the United States
Asphyxia-related deaths by law enforcement in the United States
Deaths from asphyxiation
December 1986 events in the United States
Female murder victims
People murdered in California
Police brutality in the United States
Police misconduct in the United States
Violence against women in the United States
California Highway Patrol
History of women in California